Jan Kleczyński is the name of:

 Jan Kleczyński, Sr. (1837–1895), Polish pianist, composer, music critic, and chess player
 Jan Kleczyński, Jr. (1875–1939), Polish critic and chess player